In Greek mythology, the Machae or Machai (Ancient Greek: Μάχαι Mákhai, "battles"; singular:  Mákhē) were the daemons (spirits) of battle and combat.

Family 
The Machai were the children of Eris and siblings to other vicious personifications like the Hysminai, the Androktasiai, and the Phonoi.

 And hateful Eris bore painful Ponos ("Hardship"),
 Lethe ("Forgetfulness") and Limos ("Starvation") and the tearful Algea ("Pains"),
 Hysminai ("Battles"), Makhai ("Wars"), Phonoi ("Murders"), and Androktasiai ("Manslaughters");
 Neikea ("Quarrels"), Pseudea ("Lies"), Logoi ("Stories"), Amphillogiai ("Disputes")
 Dysnomia ("Anarchy") and Ate ("Ruin"), near one another,
 and Horkos ("Oath"), who most afflicts men on earth,
 Then willing swears a false oath.

Mythology
The daemons Homados (Battle-Noise), Alala (War-Cry), Proioxis (Onrush), Palioxis (Backrush) and Kydoimos (Confusion) were closely associated with the Machai.

They were accompanied in battlefields by other deities and spirits associated with war and death, such as Ares, Phobos, Deimos, the Keres, Polemos, Enyo, and their mother Eris.

Popular culture
 The Machai make an appearance in Wrath of the Titans as Hades and later Cronus' troops. The Machai are similar to the Moliones, with coal black skin, two legs, six arms, two-headed and two torsos back to back with each other which enables them to attack more than one person.
 In The Blood of Olympus, Asclepius used the Machai (In this they are the twin children of Ares and Aphrodite, Phobos and Deimos), the curse of Delos (Which is actually one of the  small yellow flowers that Delos sprouted upon the birth of Artemis and Apollo), and the Pylosian Mint in order to formulate a physician's cure. (The two brothers also appear in "The Demigod Files", but not by the name Machai.)
 In the top down ARPG Titan Quest: Immortal Throne, Makhai are enemies, that can be found in the final world of the game, "Hades".
 The Machai appears in Agents of HOPE during "Titan's Awakening", the 32nd chapter of the game. It is a mini-boss which is fought during the second combat of the chapter on Perses' back.

See also 

 Alke
 Ioke
 Polemus

Notes

References 

 Hesiod, Shield of Heracles from The Homeric Hymns and Homerica with an English Translation by Hugh G. Evelyn-White, Cambridge, MA.,Harvard University Press; London, William Heinemann Ltd. 1914. Online version at the Perseus Digital Library. Greek text available from the same website.
 Hesiod, Theogony from The Homeric Hymns and Homerica with an English Translation by Hugh G. Evelyn-White, Cambridge, MA.,Harvard University Press; London, William Heinemann Ltd. 1914. Online version at the Perseus Digital Library. Greek text available from the same website.

Greek war deities
War goddesses
Greek goddesses
Personifications in Greek mythology
Children of Eris (mythology)
Greek legendary creatures
Daimons
Combat